Gunnar Mikael Höckert (12 February 1910 – 11 February 1940) was a Finnish runner, winner of the 5000 m race at the 1936 Summer Olympics.

Biography
Born in Helsinki to a wealthy family, Gunnar Höckert had only one great season, in 1936. The 5000 m final at the Berlin Olympics started in a good pace. The tempo was dictated by American Donald Lash, but he was overtaken by three Finns after 2,000 m. Soon the race turned into a battle between Höckert and defending Olympic Champion and world record holder Lauri Lehtinen. In the last lap Höckert overran Lehtinen to win in a world's season best time of 14:22.2. In this same race Gunnar's teammate Henry Jonsson got third place over Kohei Murakoso, the Japanese runner who was leading the race at the beginning.

Later on that season, on 16 September in Stockholm, Höckert ran a new world record in 3,000 m (8:14.8). A week later, on the same track, Höckert ran a new world record in 2 miles (8:57.4) and another week later, he equalled the Jules Ladoumegue's 2,000 m world record of 5:21.8 in Malmö.

The rest of Höckert's athletics career was hampered by rheumatism, and he never again achieved the times he had run in 1936. He went to the Winter War as a volunteer, progressing to 2nd lieutenant. He was killed during the Winter War on the Karelian Isthmus, just one day before his thirtieth birthday.

References

1910 births
1940 deaths
Burials at Hietaniemi Cemetery
Athletes from Helsinki
People from Uusimaa Province (Grand Duchy of Finland)
Swedish-speaking Finns
Finnish male middle-distance runners
Finnish male long-distance runners
Finnish male steeplechase runners
Olympic athletes of Finland
Athletes (track and field) at the 1936 Summer Olympics
Olympic gold medalists for Finland
World record setters in athletics (track and field)
Finnish military personnel killed in World War II
Medalists at the 1936 Summer Olympics
Olympic gold medalists in athletics (track and field)